Kuy-e Emam Metro Station is a station on Isfahan Metro Line 1. The station opened on 18 March 2018. It is located on Hezar Jarib at the intersection with Kuy-e Bahar St., near Kuy-e Emam St., the station's namesake. The next station on the north side is Kargar Station and Defa'-e Moqaddas (Soffeh) Station on the south side. The station is located next to University of Isfahan campus.

References

Isfahan Metro stations
Railway stations opened in 2017